The international organisation for World Urbanism Day, also known as "World Town Planning Day", was founded in 1949 by the late Professor Carlos Maria della Paolera of the University of Buenos Aires, a graduate at the Institut d'urbanisme in Paris, to advance public and professional interest in planning. It is celebrated in more than 30 countries on four continents each November 8.

See also
 Urbanism
 Urban planning
 New Urbanism
 Institut d'Urbanisme de Paris (French Wikipedia)

References

External links 
 American Planning Association: World Town Planning Day
  World Urbanism Day from WN Network

Urban planning
Planned cities
Garden suburbs
November observances
International observances